Refsnes Gods is a hotel near the town of Moss, Norway, on the island of Jeløy. According to Frommer's travel guide, it is "the most elegant resort in the environs of Oslo". The building was originally constructed in 1767 as a pleasure pavilion. It contains a notable art collection.

"Refsnes" stems from the Norwegian word "rif" (English: reef) due to a reef in the Oslofjord just outside the mansion. "Gods" means mansion in Norwegian.

Since the new owners, Gunn and Widar Salbuvik, took over in 1998, a large number of unique pieces of art have found a new home at Refsnes Gods.  Every guest room and all the common areas have works of a dedicated artist displayed. More than 400 pieces from 90 well-known artists are represented. The list of the artists include names like: Andy Warhol, Edvard Munch, Therese Nordtvedt, Carl Nesjar, Kjell Nupen, Håkon Bleken, Frans Widerberg, Jacob Weidemann. Three works by Munch were stolen from the hotel in March 2005; they were shortly recovered, although one of the works was damaged during the robbery. The resort is also known for its wine cellar.

References

External links
www.refsnesgods.no

Hotels in Viken
Commercial buildings completed in 1767
1767 establishments in Norway